Coffin Top is a mountain with a flattened summit,  high, located  east-northeast of Mount Fagan and  northwest of Moltke Harbour, South Georgia. The feature was named "Sarg-Berg" (coffin mountain) by the German group of the International Polar Year Expedition, 1882–83. An English form of the name, Coffin Top, was recommended by UK Antarctic Place-Names Committee in 1954.

References 

Mountains and hills of South Georgia